On 2 September 2022, around 50 members of the climate change activist group Extinction Rebellion staged a protest in the House of Commons in the Palace of Westminster, the home of the British Parliament. The protesters were on a guided tour of Parliament when they went into the main section of the  House of Commons and three of them glued themselves together next to the Speaker's chair. The protestors read a speech demanding a citizen's assembly on climate change issues. A total of eight people were arrested - four who glued themselves to each other in the Chamber, two who had locked themselves inside the chamber gates, one who had climbed onto scaffolding outside the Parliament, and one who had glued himself to the pavement on the premises. Parliament was not in session at the time.

References

Environmental protests in the United Kingdom
Climate change protests
2022 protests
Palace of Westminster
September 2022 events in the United Kingdom
Extinction Rebellion
Climate change in the United Kingdom